A chorbishop is a rank of Christian clergy below bishop. The name chorepiscope or chorepiscopus (plural chorepiscopi) is taken from the Greek  and means "rural bishop".

History
Chorepiscopi are first mentioned by Eusebius as existing in the second century. In the beginning, it seems the chorepiscopi exercised regular episcopal functions in their rural districts, but from the late third century they were subject to city or metropolitan bishops. The Synod of Ancyra (314) specifically forbade them to ordain deacons or priests. The Council of Sardica (343) decreed that no chorepiscopus should be consecrated where a priest would suffice, and so the chorepiscopi in the Byzantine Church gradually disappeared.

The first mentions of chorepiscopi in the Western church are from the 5th or 6th century, where they were found mainly in Germany (especially Bavaria) and the Frankish lands. In the Western Church, they were treated as auxiliary bishops and operated like archdeacons or vicars general. They gradually disappeared as an office by the 12th century in the West and were replaced by archdeacons to administer subdivisions of a diocese.

In the principality of Kakheti in medieval Georgia, the title of chorepiscopus (k'orepiskoposi or k'orikozi) became secular and was borne by several princes of that province from the early 9th century into the 11th.

Present practice
Some Eastern Catholic and Oriental Orthodox churches still have chorbishops. 

The Churches of the Syriac tradition — namely the Syriac Orthodox Church, the Assyrian Church of the East, the Syriac Catholic Church, the Maronite Church, the Chaldean Catholic Church, the Syro-Malankara Catholic Church, the Malankara Jacobite Syriac Orthodox Church, and the Malankara Orthodox Syrian Church — also preserve the office, calling it corepiscopa or coorepiscopa. In these churches, the chorbishop vests almost identically to the bishop and often serves as his representative to various liturgical events to add solemnity.

In the Maronite Church, a chorbishop is the highest of the three Median Orders, ranking above the orders of archdeacon and periodeut. Like a bishop, a chorbishop is ordained, and entitled to all vestments proper to a bishop, including the mitre (hat) and crozier (staff). The Synod of Mt. Lebanon (1736) limited only the jurisdiction of a chorbishop, permitting him to ordain to the minor orders (cantor, reader and the subdiaconate), but not the major orders of diaconate, priesthood, or episcopacy. The manuscript tradition of the Syriac Maronite Church demonstrates that the same text is used for the imposition of hand for both bishops and chorbishops. The title of the ordination for a chorbishop reads, in fact, "The chirotony by which are completed the chorbishops and the metropolitans and the high orders of priesthood." The role of protosyncellus (vicar general) is often filled by a chorbishop.

In some Orthodox churches, "chorbishop" is an alternative name for an auxiliary bishop.

See also
Synods of Antioch
Synod of Ancyra

References

Episcopacy in the Catholic Church
Ecclesiastical titles
Eastern Christian ecclesiastical offices
Oriental Orthodoxy
Christian terminology
Noble titles of Georgia (country)
Catholic ecclesiastical titles